Max Gubler  (born  Zürich, May 26, 1898, died  Zürich July 29, 1973) was a Swiss artist.

Life
Max Gubler was the son of a  painter. His two older brothers Eduard (1891–1971) and Ernst  (1895–1958) were also artists. He trained as a primary school teacher between 1914 and 1918 before moving to Berlin in 1920. From 1923 to 1927 he lived mostly on the island of Lipari, where he painted many pictures.  From 1930 to 1937 he lived in Paris, before  returning to Zürich.

He  experimented with various contemporary styles, until developing his own personal vivid style of landscape painting on Lipari. Later he turned to abstraction, but continued to use bright colours. In 1956 he did a series of pastel illustrations for Ernest Hemingway's The Old Man and the Sea. In his late works, darker colours predominate.

His work was shown in many galleries. There were exhibitions of his works at the Lehnbachhaus in Munich in 1963 and  the Kunstmuseum Bern in 1969. After his death a retrospective was held at the Kunsthaus Zurich in 1975.

References
This article was initially translated from the German Wikipedia.

20th-century Swiss painters
Swiss male painters
1898 births
1973 deaths
20th-century Swiss male artists